Oil  is a 2009 documentary film directed by Massimiliano Mazzotta.  It explores the Italian energy provider Saras S.p.A., operating in the area of oil refining and the production of electricity, located in the island of Sardinia, near Cagliari and the impact of oil development on the land and lives of the local population.

Awards 
Best Documentary – Section Italian Documentaries  Italian Environmental Film Festival, 2009

External links
 Il Documento Oil. Documentario sulla Saras English subtitles

2009 films
2009 in the environment
2009 documentary films
Documentary films about environmental issues
Documentary films about petroleum
Films shot in Sardinia
Italian documentary films
2000s Italian-language films
2000s Italian films